is a district in Nemuro Subprefecture, Hokkaido, Japan.  As of 2004, it has an estimated population of 17,010 and an area of 1,320.15 km2.

Towns
Betsukai

History
1869 - Hokkaido divided into 11 provinces and 86 districts, Notsuke district placed in Nemuro Province
April 1, 1923 - Chashikotsu Village from Notsuke district, Shibetsu Village and Ichani Village from Shibetsu District,  Chuurui Village, Kunnebetsu (?) Village and Sakimui?? Village (崎無意村) from Menashi District merge to form Shibetsu Village (now Shibetsu Town) in Shibetsu District.
April 1, 1923 - Betsukai Village, Hiraito Village, Notsuke Village from Notsuke District, Nishibetsu? Village, Sōkotan?? Village and part of Atsubetsu Village from Nemuro District merge to form Betsukai Village (now Town)
April 1, 1955 - Part of Betsukai Village separated off to be incorporated into Nakashibetsu Town, Shibetsu District.

Districts in Hokkaido